Tudeh (also Romanized as Tūdeh) is a village in Sakhvid Rural District of Nir District of Taft County, Yazd province, Iran. At the 2006 National Census, its population was 183 in 61 households. The following census in 2011 counted 283 people in 93 households. The latest census in 2016 showed a population of 217 people in 85 households; it was the largest village in its rural district.

References 

Taft County

Populated places in Yazd Province

Populated places in Taft County